Laitilan Wirvoitusjuomatehdas is a Finnish brewery and a soft drinks company based in Laitila. It was founded in 1995 and now the company owns several brands, such as: Kukko beers, OIVA ciders, Kievari beers and Wanhanajan Limonaadi lemonades. The company also produces, for example, the Euro Shopper ciders sold in Finland and the Hurriganes beer, which is named after a famous Finnish rock group. Since 2001, all of the products of Laitilan Wirvoitusjuomatehdas are manufactured using wind power. Furthermore, some of the products, for example the Kukko beers (except for the porter and wheat beer), are also gluten free and as such suitable for Coeliac disease sufferers.

The company was previously known as Fisutta Oy and it was renamed in November 2006 as Laitilan Wirvoitusjuomatehdas Oy.

The company uses the archaic spelling "wirvoitus" instead of the contemporary spelling "virvoitus" (Finnish for "refreshment") on purpose to evoke an old-fashioned feel.

Soft drinks 
 La Rita (orange lemonade)
 Lemona (lemonade)
 Messina (blood orange lemonade)
 Rio Cola (cola)
 Rio Rita (grapefruit lemonade)
 Sitruuna-Sooda (lemonade)

Alcoholic beverages 
 Kukko (beer brand)
 OIVA (cider brand)
 Kievari (beer brand)
 Hurriganes (beer brand)

References

External links 
 Laitilan Wirvoitusjuomatehdas – Official site 

Companies established in 1995
Breweries in Finland
1995 establishments in Finland